The Wright Commander was a low-floor single-decker bus body built on the DAF/VDL SB200 chassis by Wrightbus between 2002 and 2007.

History
Visually and structurally, it is a larger version of the Wright Cadet. Along with the Cadet, it perpetuated the 'Classic' styling for several years after the Scania (Axcess-Floline) and Volvo (Renown) based equivalents had been phased out. Of the 315 produced, 288 were purchased by Arriva including 188 for its Netherlands subsidiary.

The Commander was superseded by the Pulsar.

References

External links

Low-entry buses
Low-floor buses
Vehicles introduced in 2002
Commander